Viktoria Kirsanova (born 29 October 1998) is a Russian cross-country mountain biker. She competed in the women's cross-country event at the 2020 Summer Olympics.

Major results
2019
 1st  National XCO Championships
2020
 1st  National XCO Championships
 3rd  European Under-23 XCO Championships
2021
 1st  National XCO Championships

References

External links

1998 births
Living people
Cross-country mountain bikers
Russian female cyclists
Olympic cyclists of Russia
Cyclists at the 2020 Summer Olympics